Moon Palace, Lunar Palace, Palace of the Moon, or variant may refer to:

 Moon Palace (1989), English-language novel by Paul Auster set in the U.S.
 Candraprabha, the bodhisattva or deva of the Lunar Palace (or Moon Palace)
 The Moon Palace or Lunar Palace, a fictional location in Yun Mi-kyung's manhwa Bride of the Water God
 Moon Palace, a fictional location in Eiichi Ikegami's novel Shangri-La (シャングリ·ラ)

See also
 Yuegong-1 (月宮一号), Lunar Palace 1 or Moon Palace 1, ecological life support system research facility in Beijing